The politics of the Netherlands Antilles, a former constituent country of the Kingdom of the Netherlands, existed in a framework of a parliamentary representative democratic country, in which the prime minister was the head of government, and of a multi-party system. Executive power was exercised by the government. Federal legislative power was vested in both the government and parliament. The Judiciary was independent of the executive and the legislature. The Netherlands Antilles had full autonomy on most matters. Exceptions were defence, foreign affairs, and the Supreme Court.

Executive power rested with a governor, and a prime minister headed an eight-member Cabinet. The governor was appointed for a six-year term by the monarch, and the prime minister and deputy prime minister were elected by the Staten for four-year terms. The legislature or Staten elected by direct, popular vote to serve four-year terms.

The judicial system, which had mainly been derived from the Dutch system, operated independently of the legislature and the executive. Jurisdiction, including appeal, lied with the Common Court of Justice of the Netherlands Antilles and Aruba and the Supreme Court of Justice in the Netherlands.

The Netherlands Antilles were disbanded on 10 October 2010.

Executive branch

The Governor was appointed by the monarch for a six-year term.
The Council of Ministers was elected by the Staten.

Legislative branch
Unicameral Estates of the Netherlands Antilles (22 seats; members were elected by popular vote to serve four-year terms)

Political parties and elections

Political parties were indigenous to each island.

Judicial branch
Joint High Court of Justice, judges appointed by the monarch

Administrative divisions
The Antilles were divided into five insular territories: Curaçao, Bonaire, Sint Maarten, Saba, Sint Eustatius. On 10 October 2010 the Netherlands Antilles were disbanded.

Reform

International organization participation 
Caricom (observer), ECLAC (associate), Interpol, IOC, UNESCO (associate), UPU, WMO, WToO (associate)

References